The 1984 Campionati Internazionali di Sicilia was a men's tennis tournament played on outdoor clay courts in Palermo, Italy that was part of the 1984 Volvo Grand Prix. It was the sixth edition of the tournament and took place from 10 September until 16 September 1984. Fourth-seeded Francesco Cancellotti won the singles title.

Finals

Singles
 Francesco Cancellotti defeated  Miloslav Mečíř 6–0, 6–3
 It was Cancellotti's 2nd and last singles title of the year and of his career.

Doubles
 Tomáš Šmíd /  Blaine Willenborg defeated  Claudio Panatta /  Henrik Sundström 6–7, 6–3, 6–0

References

External links
 ITF tournament edition details

Campionati Internazionali di Sicilia
Campionati Internazionali di Sicilia
Campionati Internazionali di Sicilia